Scott James Cameron (born 24 September 1996) is a Scottish cricketer. He made his One Day International (ODI) debut for Scotland against Ireland in the 2017–18 United Arab Emirates Tri-Nation Series on 18 January 2018. Prior to his ODI debut, he was named in Scotland's squad for the 2016 Under-19 Cricket World Cup, but he injured his back before the start of the tournament.

In June 2019, he was selected to represent Scotland A in their tour to Ireland to play the Ireland Wolves. He made his Twenty20 debut for Scotland A against the Ireland Wolves on 9 June 2019. In July 2019, he was selected to play for the Glasgow Giants in the inaugural edition of the Euro T20 Slam cricket tournament. However, the following month the tournament was cancelled.

References

External links
 

1996 births
Living people
Scottish cricketers
Scotland One Day International cricketers
Cricketers from Dundee